Bobby Micho (born March 7, 1962) is a former American football tight end and fullback. He played for the San Diego Chargers in 1984 and for the Denver Broncos from 1986 to 1987.

References

1962 births
Living people
American football tight ends
American football fullbacks
Texas Longhorns football players
San Diego Chargers players
Denver Broncos players